On the Edge is the fifth and final studio album by hard rock band The Babys. The album was produced by Keith Olsen in 1980. "Turn and Walk Away" was the lone single to chart on the Billboard Hot 100, peaking at No. 42.

Track listing
"Turn and Walk Away" (Waite, Cain) – 3:10
"Sweet 17" (Waite, Cain, Stocker) – 2:47
"She's My Girl" (Waite, Stocker) – 3:17
"Darker Side of Town" (Waite, Cain) – 2:25
"Rock 'n' Roll Is (Alive and Well)" (Waite, Cain, Phillips) – 4:07
"Downtown" ( Waite, Stocker) – 3:36
"Postcard" (Waite, Stocker, Brock, Phillips) – 2:41
"Too Far Gone" (Cain, Brock) Lead vocals - Jonathan Cain  – 2:53
"Gonna Be Somebody" (Waite, Cain, Brock) – 2:57
"Love Won't Wait" (Waite, Cain) Lead vocals - Jonathan Cain  – 3:01

Personnel
 John Waite  – lead vocals
 Wally Stocker – lead and rhythm guitars
 Jonathan Cain – keyboards, backing vocals, rhythm guitar, lead vocals "Too Far Gone"
 Ricky Phillips – bass
 Tony Brock – drums

Additional personnel
Anne Marie Leclerc: backing vocals on "Sweet 17"

References 
3.  https://ultimateclassicrock.com/babys-on-the-edge/

1980 albums
The Babys albums
Albums produced by Keith Olsen
Chrysalis Records albums